De Gids (meaning The Guide in English) is the oldest Dutch literary periodical still published today. It was founded in 1837 by Everhardus Johannes Potgieter and Christianus Robidé van der Aa. Long regarded as the most prestigious literary periodical in the Netherlands, it was considered outdated by the Tachtigers of the 1880s, who founded De Nieuwe Gids (meaning The New Guide in English) in opposition to the periodical. In 2011, De Gids ceased operations, but has been taken over as De-Gids-nieuwe-stijl by De Groene Amsterdammer.

All volumes of De Gids up to 2012 are published in the Digital Library for Dutch Literature

References

External links 
 De Gids website

1837 establishments in the Netherlands
Dutch-language magazines
Literary magazines published in the Netherlands
Magazines established in 1837
Magazines published in Amsterdam
Bi-monthly magazines published in the Netherlands